Shashank Venkatesh Manohar (born 29 September 1957) is a prominent Indian lawyer and cricket administrator. He twice served as the President of the Board of Control for Cricket in India, from 2008 to 2011, and again from November 2015 to May 2016. He served as the chairman of the International Cricket Council from November 2015 to March 2017. On 24 March 2017, a resolution was passed to reinstate him as the chairman until a successor was elected.

Board of Control for Cricket in India Presidency - First term, 2008–11

During his presidency, India became the number-one-ranked Test side and won the 2011 ICC Cricket World Cup, defeating Sri Lanka by 6 wickets in the final. In June 2010, he suspended IPL commissioner and BCCI vice president Lalit Modi for his misdemeanors relating to the Kochi Tuskers Kerala IPL franchise. Before being president of BCCI, he was president of Vidarbha Cricket Association.

Response to the 2013 Indian Premier League spot-fixing saga
Manohar lashed out at the players involved in the 2013 Indian Premier League spot-fixing and betting case and said that every match in the ongoing season of the Indian Premier League (IPL) should be investigated. It was widely speculated that he would be given the interim charge of the BCCI in the aftermath of the 2013 Indian Premier League spot-fixing case. But he refused to be the caretaker chief of BCCI, if N. Srinivasan continues in his role as the BCCI president. He had told BCCI vice-president Arun Jaitley in clear terms before 2 June 2013 working committee meeting that he was "not interested" in taking charge of the Board on an ad-hoc basis because such an ad hoc appointment is void as per the BCCI constitution. The BCCI constitution does not have a provision for Dual Presidency.

Allegations of foreign exchange violations in IPL 2009
In June 2013 the Enforcement Directorate (ED) sent him a notice for adjudication issued against him over allegations of foreign exchange violations in the IPL tournament held in South Africa in 2009, for which he approached the Bombay High Court challenging the notice. His counsel told the Bombay High Court that Lalit Modi who was chairman IPL and vice-president BCCI during IPL in 2009 took all major decisions after approval from the BCCI committee. Modi could have received his first 'reprimand' from Manohar back in March 2010, but former India captain Sunil Gavaskar, then a member of the Governing Council, requested that the 'reprimand' not be recorded. Manohar had advised the IPL governing council to first take permission from RBI and only then open an account in South Africa. In response, the Bombay High Court quashed and set aside the notice issued by Enforcement Directorate (ED).

BCCI elections September 2013
Even though a majority of members wanted Srinivasan out and had the numbers to do so, they were rendered powerless by a technicality. Srinivasan had all but made sure he will be elected unopposed as his rivals didn't have a proposer and seconder from South Zone for their candidate. Under BCCI rules, a contender for the top post must have the endorsement of at least two units from the zone whose turn it is to elect the president.

Manohar tore apart Srinivasan in an interview to the tabloid Mumbai Mirror on 3 October 2013. He said that as Srinivasan was responsible for the mess in BCCI, he should not be BCCI president any more. He further said "Srinivasan has no right to continue as president. If you had the slightest of conscience, self-esteem and care for the board, you ought to have put in your papers the moment your son-in-law (Gurunath Meiyappan) was arrested [for betting in IPL. You did nothing and, as a result, the board's reputation has taken a hit to the extent that the people have lost faith in this board." He concluded by saying: "I left the board two years back and I have not entered its premises again. I have no intention to come back. I said if all the members want me, I will not shirk the responsibility. This board has given me a lot and I was willing to give something back."

April 2014 BCCI emergent Working committee meeting
The Board of Control for Cricket in India (BCCI) called an emergent working committee meeting in Mumbai on Sunday, 20 April 2014, to decide its future course of action following the Supreme Court's order that forced Srinivasan to step aside as the cricket board's president. The meeting was called after several state associations wrote to the BCCI interim president (administration) Shivlal Yadav, demanding a discussion on the ongoing issues. Many state cricket association members think that only Shashank Manohar can restore cricket board's credibility. They wanted Manohar to lend his voice to their unhappiness at the meeting.

After attending the Working Committee meeting as a representative of Vidarbha Cricket Association, Manohar said "I can't disclose what happened at the meeting. All I can say is I was disillusioned with the happenings. I had gone there with the purpose of cleaning up the image of the Board in public domain, but I was disillusioned."

Manohar was outvoted 14–1 at the meeting for the appointment of three-member inquiry panel. Manohar alleged the committee appointed Srinivasan's "cronies" to investigate his own wrongdoings in the board.

Manohar had said in the April 2014 Working committee meeting that Justice Mudgal who is completely unbiased and can effectively probe the scam with the help of CBI instead of the 3 members elected by Srinivasan's cronies.

On 22 April 2014 the Supreme Court of India endorsed Manohar's view and rejected BCCI's proposed panel to probe the IPL scam, asked Mudgal committee if it can help probe the scam with the help of CBI.

Justice Mudgal Committee report in the IPL corruption scandal
In April 2014 the Supreme Court of India appointed probe commission headed by (Retd) Justice Mukul Mudgal  to investigate the betting and match fixing scandal in the IPL. The committee also included Additional Solicitor General L Nageswara Rao, advocate Nilay Datta, Deputy DG (Narcotics Control Bureau) BB Mishra, Vidushpat Singhania (Secretary) and the police departments in Delhi, Mumbai and Chennai to assist the investigation.

N.Srinivasan named in the Mudgal Committee Report
In November 2014 in response to the final submission of the Mudgal Committee Report, a special bench of the Supreme Court of India comprising justice TS Thakur and FM Kalifullah has named and issued notices to four key individuals including N Srinivasan and Gurunath Meiyappan in connection with the Mudgal report into the 2013 IPL spot-fixing case, which, the court observed, had suggested several "misdemeanours" by the duo.

In view of the court's observation, Manohar urged the BCCI member associations to take a stance. "The image of the Board is tarnished by the actions and the attitude of Mr Srinivasan. The gentlemen's game, as the game of cricket has long been known, and the reputation of the Board is at its lowest due to the egoistic and autocratic behaviour of one individual. The Board and the game of Cricket is bigger than any individual and it is the responsibility and duty of every individual connected with the game to preserve the dignity and integrity of the Game and the Board, and through this press note, I appeal to all members of the Board to rise to the occasion and prevent the Board and the Game from being further destroyed."

Manohar said on 14 November that the BCCI was flouting its own constitution by repeatedly putting off its Annual General Meeting that should have been held before 30 September. "It appears that during today's hearing, as soon as the names of Srinivasan and Meiyappan were disclosed, the counsel for the BCCI made a request for the postponement of the AGM and elections scheduled on November 20," Manohar said.
"It is thus evident that the instructions given to the Board counsel are only with an intent to suit Srinivasan as that would ensure that he still remains a back-seat driver," said Manohar. The AGM has been postponed by four weeks, the second time it has been deferred, a first in BCCI's history!

The then former BCCI president argued that since the Supreme Court has named Srinivasan and his son-in-law Gurunath Meiyappan, it means there are allegations of corruption against them in the report. Yet Srinivasan remote controls the BCCI, complained Manohar.

It had been widely said that Manohar may once again reform a new axis that could challenge Srinivasan's juggernaut in BCCI in the upcoming AGM.

Board of Control for Cricket in India Presidency - Second term, 2015–16

Second innings as BCCI chief

Less than 24 hours after refusing to be part of any alliance involving Srinivasan, Manohar emerged as the clear favourite to succeed the late Jagmohan Dalmiya as the president.

According to media reports, Manohar's candidature had been endorsed by Sharad Pawar, Arun Jaitley and his protege Anurag Thakur, the BCCI secretary. Manohar, who has a squeaky clean image and a no-nonsense approach to administration, soon emerged as the favourite. However, he has repeatedly refused to enter the poll fray after completing his term as BCCI president in 2011, given the mess in the board. Manohar changed his mind only after Arun Jaitley and Sharad Pawar both endorsed his candidature. With Rajiv Shukla too throwing his weight behind Manohar, the forthcoming SGM may not even see a contest.

Maharashtra Cricket Association (MCA) president Ajay Shirke has said "Our priority was to find a replacement for Mr Dalmiya. We've found one. Like Mr Dalmiya, Shashank Manohar is a man of integrity. So, the leadership question has been addressed." He also said that In times like these, the board needs a strong president like him to reinstate the trust of the people. It took a lot of persuasion from Union Finance Minister Arun Jaitley and Anurag Thakur to convince a reluctant Manohar to take up the top job all over again. The deal was clinched when Pawar, the leader of Manohar's group, also gave his go-ahead in the matter along with former treasurer Ajay Shirke, a senior BCCI official told PTI.

On 4 October 2015 he was elected as the new president of the BCCI unopposed in the special general meeting called by the board on Sunday. The decision was a mere formality as all six state associations from the East Zone, led by Cricket Association of Bengal's new chief Sourav Ganguly had nominated him to the chair.

Promises made at the post-election  press conference

"In last few days the confidence of cricket loving fans has shaken due to certain unpleasant things that have happened," Manohar said at a press conference after his election."But leaving them behind, it's now duty of all board members to build the reputation of this board." "We want to restore the faith of fans that cricket is clean," Manohar said.

Manohar has made six promises which would be implemented in the immediate near future:

1.) Regulating conflict of interest issues: Appointment of an ombudsman or an ethics officer who would be independent of this board and who would look into the complaints as with regards to conflict of interest of the administrators, players or the staff.
2.) Preventing on-field corruption: He said, "We would like to meet the government officials to work out if we can get certain investigative agencies to work on this. Because the board doesn't have any investigative powers… our hands are tied."
3) Getting member associations' accounts in order: The board will appoint auditors to make sure that the huge money paid by the BCCI it is spent on cricketing activities or not otherwise.
4.) Making the BCCI's financial records public: The balance sheet of the board will be put on the website, with the result it will be available to the entire public at large so that there is transparency in the activities of the board.
5.) Developing the bench strength of the Indian team: Starting of National Cricket Academy (NCA) again.
6.) Reinvigorate Women's cricket

International Cricket Council Chairmanship - 2015–2020

Removal of N Srinivasan
Srinivasan was removed as the ICC Chairman on 9 November 2015 after the BCCI decided to recall him and nominate its recently elected President Shashank Manohar as the chief of the world body.
The decision to remove Srinivasan was taken at the BCCI's 86th Annual General Meeting.

Resgination from the post in 2020
Shashank Manohar resigned from the post of chairman of the International Cricket Council (ICC) on 30 June 2020. He held this position for four years and after him, ICC deputy chairman Imran Khwaja was made interim chairman until the election.

Personal life
Shashank Manohar comes from a "formidable & well-known" family of lawyers. He is the eldest son of Sandhya and VR Manohar. VR Manohar (known as "The" मनोहर वकील)  was the Advocate General of Maharashtra during the Chief ministership of Sharad Pawar and also served as the President of Vidarbha Cricket Association in the past. Shashank's paternal grandfather RK Manohar was also a lawyer and was associated with the Bharatiya Jana Sangh and he contested an election on its ticket. Justice M.L Pendse, a judge on the Bombay High Court was his maternal uncle. Shashank's younger brother Sunil Manohar has also served as the Advocate General of Maharashtra. His sister Vasanti Naik is a judge at the Bombay High Court.

Shashank Manohar married Varsha Oka in 1979. Their son Adwait Manohar is a lawyer in Nagpur and currently a vice-president of Vidarbha Cricket Association.

Shashank Manohar's mother tongue is Marathi. He is equally fluent in Hindi and English. He is said to be an introvert bordering on the recluse. He didn't have a passport until 2007, and his first foreign trip was to Dubai to attend the ICC meeting in 2008.

References

1957 births
Living people
Indian cricket administrators
20th-century Indian lawyers
Scholars from Nagpur
Presidents of the Board of Control for Cricket in India
Chairmen of the International Cricket Council